Benjamin Britten: A Life in the Twentieth Century is a book by the Australian author and composer Paul Kildea first published in January 2013 to mark the centenary year of British composer Benjamin Britten. The book was featured on BBC Radio 4's Book of the Week in February 2013.

References

2013 non-fiction books
Benjamin Britten
Biographies about musicians
Biographies about LGBT people
British biographies
Penguin Books books
Allen Lane (imprint) books